Eberechukwu Nwizu  (born July 1, 1984), better known as Bhaira Mcwizu or  Bayray McNwizu  is a Nigerian actress. She is a  graduate of philosophy from the Lagos State University, Ojo. Bayray came to the limelight after winning the third Amstel Malta Box Office (AMBO) reality show. In 2009, she received an Africa Movie Academy Awards nomination.

Filmography  
 Cindy's Note
 Tales of Eve
 Kiss and Tell (2011)
 Calabash
 Lies Men Tell
 My Rich Boyfriend (2014)
 A Lonely Night
 Cruel Intentions
 The Visit (2015)
 Tiwa's Baggage''
 Broken walls
 April
Crazy Grannies

TV series

See also
 List of Nigerian actors

References

External links 
 

Igbo actresses
21st-century Nigerian actresses
Living people
Nigerian film actresses
1984 births
Nigerian models
Lagos State University alumni
Participants in Nigerian reality television series